The 2014–15 Bethune–Cookman Wildcats men's basketball team represented Bethune–Cookman University during the 2014–15 NCAA Division I men's basketball season. The Wildcats, led by fourth year head coach Gravelle Craig, played their home games at the Moore Gymnasium and were members of the Mid-Eastern Athletic Conference. They finished the season 11–21, 7–9 in MEAC play to finish in a tie for seventh place. They lost in the first round of the MEAC tournament to Coppin State.

Roster

Schedule

|-
!colspan=9 style="background:#6A3547; color:#E4A41D;"| Regular season

|-
!colspan=9 style="background:#6A3547; color:#E4A41D;"| MEAC tournament

References

Bethune–Cookman Wildcats men's basketball seasons
Bethune-Cookman